Ben Jones (born 15 April 1980 in Redcliffe, Queensland) is an Australian former professional rugby league footballer who played for the Canberra Raiders in the National Rugby League.

He retired at the conclusion of the 2008 season, citing knee injuries as the reason for his retirement.

References

External links
Redcliffe Dolphins profile
Canberra Raiders profile
NRL profile

1980 births
Australian rugby league players
Canberra Raiders players
Redcliffe Dolphins players
Rugby league second-rows
Living people
Rugby league players from Brisbane